is an asteroid, slow rotator and tumbler, classified as a near-Earth object and potentially hazardous asteroid (PHA) of the Apollo group, approximately  in diameter, making it the largest PHA known to exist. It was discovered on 13 May 1999, by astronomers of the Lincoln Near-Earth Asteroid Research at the Lincoln Laboratory's Experimental Test Site near Socorro, New Mexico.

Orbit and classification 

 orbits the Sun at a distance of 1.0–4.5 AU once every 4 years and 6 months (1,644 days; semi-major axis of 2.73 AU). Its orbit has an eccentricity of 0.64 and an inclination of 14° with respect to the ecliptic. This makes it also a Mars-crossing asteroid.

Close approaches 

For comparison, the planet Venus passed  from Earth in 2022.

Physical characteristics 

In the SMASS and Tholen classification,  is an X-type asteroid. It has also been characterized as a carbonaceous C-type asteroid, which seems more likely due to its exceptionally low albedo (see below).

Rotation period 

Radar imaging by Goldstone and Arecibo observatories revealed that  has an unusually slow and possibly chaotic rotation period, similar to that of asteroid 4179 Toutatis.

It gave a period of  hours with a brightness amplitude of 0.7 magnitude, and suggested that the body is in a non-principal axis rotation, commonly known as tumbling.

Diameter and albedo 

 measures between 5 and 7 kilometers in diameter and its surface has an exceptionally low albedo of 0.02. The Collaborative Asteroid Lightcurve Link derives an albedo of 0.03 and adopts a diameter of 7 kilometers based on an absolute magnitude of 15.2.

Numbering and naming 

This minor planet was numbered by the Minor Planet Center on 16 February 2003. As of 2018, it has not been named.

References

External links 

 Asteroid Lightcurve Database (LCDB), query form (info )
 Asteroids and comets rotation curves, CdR – Observatoire de Genève, Raoul Behrend
 
 
 

053319
053319
053319
053319
053319
053319
19990513